Anderson Aparecido Gonzaga Martíns (born December 29, 1983) is a Brazilian footballer who currently plays for Sport Boys Warnes in the Liga de Fútbol Profesional Boliviano.

In 2007, he arrived in Santa Cruz to play for Club Destroyers. The following year after having a fairly good season with the canarios, he signed for Blooming, where he exceeded the expectations and finished as the topscorer in the Apertura tournament with 16 goals. He also scored two goals against Paraguayan club Olimpia in the preliminary stage of Copa Sudamericana 2008.

In August 2008, Gonzaga was transferred to Super League Greece club Panionios F.C. After an unsuccessful stint in Europe, he returned to Bolivia and signed a one-year deal with Bolívar in August 2009.

In July 2010 he signed for Uruguayan club Danubio, where he played alongside Álvaro Recoba, who was also his teammate in Panionios F.C.

In July 2011 he joined Albirex Niigata in the J1 League on a two-year contract. Unable to secure a spot in the first team, Gonzaga was loaned to Japanese lower division clubs Fagiano Okayama in 2012 and FC Machida Zelvia in 2013. After his contract expired with Niigata, he returned to Bolivia and signed for Sport Boys Warnes in January 2014.

Honours

References

External links
 Football-lineups profile
 
 

1983 births
Living people
Brazilian footballers
Club Destroyers players
Club Blooming players
Club Bolívar players
Panionios F.C. players
Danubio F.C. players
Super League Greece players
Albirex Niigata players
Fagiano Okayama players
FC Machida Zelvia players
J1 League players
J2 League players
Japan Football League players
Brazilian expatriate footballers
Expatriate footballers in Bolivia
Expatriate footballers in Greece
Expatriate footballers in Uruguay
Expatriate footballers in Japan
Brazilian expatriate sportspeople in Bolivia
Association football forwards
People from Porto Felix